Francisco do Amaral can refer to:
Francisco Joaquim Ferreira do Amaral (1843–1923), Portuguese naval commander and politician
Francisco Keil do Amaral (1910–1975), Portuguese architect, painter and photographer
Francisco Xavier do Amaral (1937–2012), East Timorian president

See also 
Francisco Vilela do Amaral Airport in Brazil